Henari Veratau (born 3 January 1984 ) is a Papa New Guinean international rugby union professional footballer who played for the Queensland Reds and ACT Brumbies, who originally played rugby league for the Sydney Roosters in the NRL. His position is at centre and wing. He signed for French Pro D2 club Racing Métro 92 Paris in August 2008.

Background
Veratau was born in Port Moresby, Papua New Guinea.

He went to The Scots College in Sydney, winning the Honour Cap in Year 12 in 2001.

Career
In 2009, he signed with the Mitsubishi Heavy Industries Rugby Team (Mitsubishi Sagamihara DynaBoars) in Kanagawa, Japan.

He took part to the 2016 Cup of Nations with Papua New Guinea

References

External links

1984 births
People from the National Capital District (Papua New Guinea)
Papua New Guinean rugby league players
Sydney Roosters players
Papua New Guinean rugby union players
Living people
Papua New Guinean expatriate sportspeople in Australia
Papua New Guinean expatriate rugby union players
Expatriate rugby union players in Australia
People educated at Scots College (Sydney)
Rugby union centres
Rugby union wings